The Ecuadorian national under-20 football team represents Ecuador in international under-20 football competitions and is controlled by the Ecuadorian Football Federation.

History

The future of Ecuador's national team has depended on very bright young talents historically, as illustrated in the team that qualified and participated in the 2001 FIFA World Youth Championship where players such as Segundo Castillo, Felix Borja, and Franklin Salas made an impression. The U-20 squad had to wait ten years to re-qualify to the 2011 FIFA U-20 World Cup.

In 2007, Ecuador's national U-20 squad participated in the 2007 Panamerican Games. Beating the likes of Brazil and Bolivia, they reached the final gold match against Jamaica's youth team, considered another surprise for these games. It was a hard-fought game where Ecuador found themselves down in the first 5 minutes of the match. They were unsuccessful at scoring until the last 15 minutes of the game when a deflected shot from Edmundo Zura fell to Jefferson Montero, who equalized. The last few minutes saw Zura score a penalty for a foul against Wilson Folleco, and Ecuador crowned themselves as champions of the 2007 Panamerican game in Brazil's most famous stadium, El Maracana. It was the first international title obtained by any level of football team from Ecuador.

The Panamerican "Gold" team brings in young players who have already been looked at by great football clubs in Europe. These same players were called up to the 2009 South American Youth Championship.

FIFA U-20 World Cup record
1977 to 1999 – Did not qualify
2001 – Round of 16
2003 to 2009 – Did not qualify
2011 – Round of 16
2013 to 2015 – Did not qualify
2017 – Group stage
2019 – Third place
2023 – Qualified

South American Youth Championship record

1954 - First Round
1958 to 1964 - Did not participate
1967 - First Round
1971 - Did not participate
1974 - First Round
1975 to 1977 - Did not participate
1979 to 1991 - First Round
1992 to 1995 - Fourth
1997 to 1999 - First Round
2001 - Fifth
2003 - Sixth
2005 to 2009 - First Round
2011 - Fourth
2013 – Sixth
2015 – First Round
2017 – Runners-up
2019 – Champions
2021 - Tournament cancelled due to COVID-19 pandemic in the South America
2023 - Fourth

Pan American Games record
1951 to 1991 - Did not compete
1995 - Round 1
1999 to 2003 - Did not compete
2007 - Champions
2023 – Did not qualify

Current squad

Honours

 FIFA U-20 World Cup:
 Third Place: 2019
 South American Youth Championship:
 Winners: 2019
 Runners-up: 2017
 L'Alcúdia International Football Tournament:
 Winners: 2010

See also
Ecuador national football team

References

under-20
South American national under-20 association football teams